Karate for Life is a 1977 Japanese martial arts film about the martial arts master Mas Oyama starring Sonny Chiba. 

Like the previous two films, it was a combination of starring Sonny Chiba and director Kazuhiko Yamaguchi.

Plot

Cast
Sonny Chiba as Mas Oyama
Kōjirō Hongō as Shuzō Fujita
Hideo Murota as Great Yamashita
Yōko Natsuki as Reiko
Asao Uchida as Ryu Hō Gen
Masashi Ishibashi as Gōzō Yonashima

References

External links 
 

1977 films
Japanese martial arts films
1970s Japanese-language films
Karate films
Films directed by Kazuhiko Yamaguchi
Toei Company films
1977 martial arts films
Films set in Okinawa Prefecture
1970s Japanese films